Pine River Pond is a  lake located in Carroll County in eastern New Hampshire, United States, in the town of Wakefield. Its outlet is the Pine River, which flows northwest to Ossipee Lake.

The lake is classified as a warmwater fishery, with observed species including smallmouth and largemouth bass, chain pickerel, horned pout, and black crappie.

See also

List of lakes in New Hampshire

References

Lakes of Carroll County, New Hampshire